Jovana Jakšić and Renata Zarazúa were the defending champions, but both players chose not to participate.

Sanaz Marand and Caitlin Whoriskey won the title, defeating wildcards Vladica Babić and Julia Rosenqvist in the final, 7–6(7–4), 6–4.

Seeds

Draw

Draw

References
Main Draw

Braidy Industries Women's Tennis Classic - Doubles